Bihar Urban Infrastructure Development Corporation Limited, commonly abbreviated as BUIDCO,  is the urban planning agency of the state of Bihar in India, that is responsible for the infrastructure development of the state. BUDICO was set up on 16 June 2009 under the company's Act 1956 (Act 1 of 1956) Government of Bihar as an apex body for planning and co-ordination of development activities in the state. It is headquartered in West Boring canal road, Raja Pul, Patna.

BUIDCO is also a nodal executing agency of Government of Bihar for implementing the Jawaharlal Nehru National Urban Renewal Mission, National Ganga River Basin Authority, Asian Development Bank and World Bank funded urban projects.

The Buidco is governed by board of directors and is chaired by the chairman and managing director of the agency. Duda and Buda are merged in Buidco on 1 Dec 2018.

See also
Patna Regional Development Authority
Patna Municipal Corporation

References

External links
Official website of Urban Development & Housing Department

2009 establishments in Bihar
Government agencies established in 2009
State urban development authorities of India
State agencies of Bihar
Economy of Bihar